Woody Bay is a small bay on the south coast of the Isle of Wight, England. It lies along the coastline beneath the village of St. Lawrence.

The bay has a rocky and exposed shoreline with areas of shingle and a storm beach formed from large pebbles. It is backed by cliffs composed of landslide debris from the Upper Greensand and Chalk. The bay is part of the Undercliff landslide complex, although is a largely stable area of the landslide zone despite recent minor movements. 

The Isle of Wight Coastal Path runs along the coast behind the bay and onto Woody Point, where the bay can be best viewed from. A small track runs down from the coastal path on which the bay can be accessed. 

During the winter of 2019/2020 a large rotational landslide took place in the cliff face in the central section of the bay. Further minor landslides took place in the winter of 2020/2021, driving further landslide debris onto the beach.  

Immediately west of Woody Bay is the Sugarloaf, a geological formation formed from a block of tilted and slipped Upper Greensand Formation originally derived from the inland cliff. A footpath leads to the top of the Sugarloaf, with views along the Undercliff coast.

History 
According to author Adrian Searle in his 2016 book 'Churchill's Last Wartime Secret: the 1943 German raid airbrushed from history' Woody Bay is the purported landing site of a covert commando raid by German forces during the Second world war with the aim of retrieving equipment and prisoners from the nearby site of RAF St Lawrence. The landings were then supposedly the subject of a cover up by the British Government.  The credibility of the raid however has been challenged, and it is not widely accepted that it was a genuine event.

References

Bays of the Isle of Wight